Hoplias teres is a species of trahiras. It is a tropical, benthopelagic freshwater fish which is known to inhabit Lake Maracaibo in Venezuela. Males can reach a maximum length of 15.3 centimetres.

Hoplias teres was originally described by Achille Valenciennes in 1847, under the genus Macrodon. It was listed as a valid species of Hoplias by Osvaldo Takeshi Oyakawa in 2003.

References

External links
 Hoplias teres at ITIS

Erythrinidae
Taxa named by Achille Valenciennes
Fish described in 1847